The Blue Albion was a British breed of cattle with an unusual blue roan coat. It originated in the English Midlands in the late nineteenth or early twentieth century, and was a dual-purpose breed, reared both for beef and for milk. It became extinct following the foot-and-mouth outbreak of 1967.

The breed was later re-created from a mixed population of cross-bred cattle, renamed the Albion the critically endangered breed is recognised as a rare breed by the Rare Breeds Survival Trust.

History 

The Blue Albion originated in the county of Derbyshire in the late nineteenth or early twentieth century; it derived from cross-breeding of Southern Wales Black and white Dairy Shorthorn stock. A herd-book was started in 1916, in which only blue roan animals could be recorded. In 1920 a breed society, the Blue Albion Cattle Society, was formed and the herd-book was published for the first time in 1937.

The breed was horned and blue roan in colour, the colouration resulting from a mixture of black and white hairs with neither colour predominant; a proportion of calves born were black or white coloured although they were ineligible for registration.

The Blue Albion was never more than a small and localised population, the last annual general meeting of the breed Society was held in 1940 and the Society was dissolved in 1966. During the foot-and-mouth outbreak of 1967 in the Midlands, large numbers of cattle were slaughtered in an attempt to limit the spread of the disease. This included nearly all the remaining Blue Albion stock, and from about 1968 the breed was considered extinct, the last bull was registered in 1972.

Recreated breed 
Following the breed's extinction blue cattle continued to be seen, these predominantly considered to be crossbreeds with shorthorn and friesian blood although there is some evidence that they included blood from the original breed. In 1989 a breed society was formed and by 2002 a survey of rare breeds recorded 95 Blue Albions, whilst these animals may descend from the original breed the proportion of original blood is considered to be low. In 2018 the recreated breed was recognised by the Rare Breeds Survival Trust with the new name Albion, it is considered to be critically endangered.

References 

Cattle breeds
Cattle breeds originating in the United Kingdom